Neptunea arthritica is a species of sea snail, a marine gastropod mollusk in the family Buccinidae, the true whelks.

Description
The length of the shell attains 75.4 mm.

Distribution
This species occurs off Japan and as an alien species in the Black Sea.

Toxicity
N. arthritica contains toxic tetramethylammonium salts (referred to as "tetramine" in this context) in its tissues, especially the salivary gland, and has the potential to cause human poisoning.

References

 Shadrin, N.V., Mironov, S.S. & Golicov, A.N., 2002. A finding of the alive Neptunea arthritica (Bernardi, 1857) (Gastropoda, Buccinidae) in the Black Sea. Ekologiya Morya 62:29.

External links
Valenciennes A. (1858) Note sur une suite intéressante de coquilles rapportées des mers du Japon, et de la Manche de Tartarie, par M. le Dr Barthe. Compte Rendu des Séances de l'Académie des Sciences [Paris 46: 759-762]
 Adams, A. (1864). On the species of Fusidae which inhabit the seas of Japan. Journal of the Proceedings of the Linnean Society, Zoology. 7: 105-108.
  Katsanevakis, S.; Bogucarskis, K.; Gatto, F.; Vandekerkhove, J.; Deriu, I.; Cardoso A.S. (2012). Building the European Alien Species Information Network (EASIN): a novel approach for the exploration of distributed alien species data. BioInvasions Records. 1: 235-245
  Kantor Y.I. & Sysoev A.V. 2002. On the species of molluscs from Russian waters described by Achille Valenciennes in little known publications in 1858. Ruthenica, 12(2): 119–123

Buccinidae
Gastropods described in 1858
[[Category:Gastropods described in 1858]